Compassion Seizes Bed-Stuy is an album by the American jazz double bassist William Parker, recorded in 1995 and released on Homestead.

The album is the third part of a sound trilogy including the sextet In Order to Survive and the solo bass Testimony. In Order to Survive is the name of the ensemble, a quartet with Rob Brown on alto sax, Cooper-Moore on piano, and newcomer Susie Ibarra on drums. "Unrestricted" is a piano-drums duo dedicated to saxophonist Julius Hemphill. "Goggles" is dedicated to bassist Earl Freeman. "For Robeson" is for Paul Robeson. "Malcolm's Smiles" is for Malcolm X. The cover art is a "MusicWitness" painting made during live recording by Jeff Schlanger.

Reception

In his review for AllMusic, Don Snowden states "Slack moments are rare and the evenly balanced contributions of all four musicians make this a fine example of freewheeling collective improvisation." The Penguin Guide to Jazz says that compared with the previous album the tracks "are more developed and feature some of the bassist's very best writing." In a double review for the Chicago Reader, Peter Margasak says that Parker's original compositions "employ a variety of melodic and structural gambits toward a single goal: highly sensitive and all-enveloping improvisation." In an article for the Boston Phoenix Ed Hazell notes that "Each track is a cathartic cry from the heart, complex, yet with utter clarity of structure."

Track listing
All compositions by William Parker
 "Compassion" – 10:38
 "Malcom's Smile" – 9:44
 "For Robeson" – 5:41
 "Holiday for Hypocrites" – 8:10
 "Testimony of the Last Flower" – 0:37
 "Dejenos en Paz" – 8:05
 "Unrestricted (for Julius Hemphill)" – 5:42 
 "Goggles" – 10:53
 "The Eye of the Window" – 9:59

Personnel
William Parker – bass
Susie Ibarra – drums 
Rob Brown – alto sax 
Cooper-Moore – piano

References

1996 albums
William Parker (musician) albums
Homestead Records albums